Belli is a surname. Notable people with the surname include:

Adriano Belli (born 1977), Canadian football player
Agostina Belli (born 1947), Italian actress
Alex Belli (born 1990), Italian model, media personality and actor
Andrea Belli (1703-1772), Maltese architect and businessman
Carlos Germán Belli (born 1927) Peruvian poet of Italian parentage
César Belli (born 1975), Brazilian footballer
Daniel Belli (born 1963), Canadian sports shooter
Domenico Belli (died 1627), Italian composer
Edo Belli (1918-2003), American architect
Francesco Belli (born 1994), Italian footballer
Gabriella Belli (born 1952), Italian art historian
Gioconda Belli (born 1948), Nicaraguan poet and writer
Giovanni Battista Belli-Bernasconi (1770-1827),  Russian architect active in Saint Petersburg
Giovanni Battista de Belli (1630-1693), Italian Roman Catholic Bishop
Girolamo Belli (1552 – c. 1620), Italian composer
Giulio Belli (c. 1560 – 1621 or later), Italian composer
Giuseppe Gioachino Belli (1791 – 1863), Italian poet, famous for his sonnets in Romanesco dialect
Giuseppe Belli (singer) (d. 1760), sometimes referred to as Giovanni Belli, Italian castrato singer
Humberto Belli (born 1945), Nicaraguan politician and writer
John Belli (died 1809), United States Army Quartermaster General
Laura Belli (born 1947), Italian actress and singer
Marisa Belli (born 1933), Italian stage, television and film actress
Mary Lou Belli, American television director and writer
Melvin Belli (1907–1996), American lawyer, writer and actor
Mihri Belli (1916–2011), Turkish politician
Paolo Belli (born 1962), Italian singer and television presenter
Peter Belli (born 1943), Danish singer and actor
Pierangelo Belli (born 1944), Italian footballer
Pierino Belli (1502–1575), Italian soldier and jurist
Remo Belli (1927-2016),  American jazz drummer 
Valerio Belli (c. 1468 – 1546), Italian medallist and engraver
Willam Belli (born 1982), American actor and drag queen
Wladimir Belli (born 1970), Italian cyclist

Italian-language surnames